The Vienna Hofburg Orchestra (in German: Wiener Hofburg Orchester) is an  Austrian classical orchestra based in  Vienna.

History
The orchestra was founded by the conductor Gert Hofbauer in 1971 and consists of 52 professional musicians from all large orchestral societies of Vienna and international vocal soloists: Andrea Olah (soprano), Kayo Takemura (soprano), Ella Tyran (soprano), Elena Suvorova (mezzo-soprano), Oskar Hillebrandt (baritone), Georg Lehner (baritone), Peter Edelmann (baritone) (son of the Austrian bass Otto Edelmann) and Bohan Choe (tenor).

The orchestra's defined aim is to "cultivate Viennese waltz and operetta music", thus the orchestra's program is composed of waltz and operetta melodies by Johann Strauss, Franz Lehár and Emmerich Kalman along with opera arias and duets by Wolfgang Amadeus Mozart.

The Vienna Hofburg Orchestra's concert season lasts from May to December. The concerts are performed in the Festival Hall  and the Redoutensäle of Vienna's Hofburg Imperial Palace, further the Wiener Konzerthaus and the Wiener Musikverein.

Each year on the evenings of  December 31 and  January 1  the Vienna Hofburg Orchestra performs traditional  Viennese New Year's Eve and New Year's Concerts in the Hofburg's festival halls.

Gallery

References

External links

 Vienna Hofburg Orchestra Website in English

Austrian orchestras
Musical groups from Vienna
1971 establishments in Austria
Musical groups established in 1971
Organisations based in Vienna